WRAK (1400 AM) is a radio station licensed to serve Williamsport, Pennsylvania.  The station is owned by iHeartMedia, Inc. and licensed to iHM Licenses, LLC. It airs a News/Talk format as "The News/Talk Network".

The station was first licensed on March 23, 1923, deleted on June 23, 1923, relicensed on February 14, 1925, deleted a second time on January 5, 1926, then reauthorized on February 9, 1926. The call letters were randomly assigned from a sequential roster of available call signs.

References

External links

RAK
News and talk radio stations in the United States
Lycoming County, Pennsylvania
Radio stations established in 1974
IHeartMedia radio stations